Michael Lopez Rama (born October 28, 1954) is a Filipino politician serving as Mayor of Cebu City since 2021, a position he previously held from 2010 to 2016. He served as the Vice Mayor of Cebu City from 2001 to 2010 and from 2019 to 2021, and was a member of the Cebu City Council from 1992 to 2001. He was elected the National President of the League of Cities of the Philippines in 2022.

Education
Mike Rama graduated as class valedictorian in Basak Elementary School in Basak San Nicolas, Cebu City. He attended the University of Southern Philippines and earned a pre-med degree from Velez College. He went on for further graduate studies in law at San Beda College in Manila. Rama passed the bar exam in 1983.

Political career
Rama started his political career as councilor of Cebu City for three successive terms from 1992 to 2001, filling in the slot of his uncle, Clemente "Cle" Rama, a veteran councilor, and leading the Committee on Education. In his third term, as the councilor who was the recipient of the most votes in the election, Rama became the first councilor that made him often assume the role as acting vice mayor and even as acting mayor. Also during his third term, he served as national president of the Philippine Councilors League (PCL).

Thereafter, Rama served three consecutive terms as vice mayor of Cebu City from 2001 to 2010 with Tomas Osmeña as mayor, and was elected the national president of the Vice Mayors League of the Philippines (VMLP).

Rama ran and won for the city mayorship in 2010, and was proclaimed as the twenty-seventh mayor of Cebu City, defeating former mayor Alvin Garcia. Rama was re-elected as mayor for a second term in 2013, defeating his former ally and mayor Tomas Osmeña. On December 2015, Malacañang ordered a 60-day preventive suspension on Rama for his alleged culpable violation of the Constitution, grave abuse of authority, grave misconduct, and oppression. Rama reported back to his office on February 8, 2016, as the 60-day suspension imposed on him by the Office of the President of the Philippines had ended. Rama ran for a third and final consecutive term in 2016, but was defeated by Osmeña by a margin of 33,894 votes.

In 2019, Rama returned to his former post as vice mayor of Cebu City, together with ally Edgardo Labella as mayor, defeating the incumbent Osmeña. Rama once again took oath as mayor on November 20, 2021 following the death of Labella the day before. Rama retained his post as city mayor in 2022, defeating city councilors Margot Osmeña and Dave Tumulak.

Personal life
Rama is a member of the Rama family, a prominent political family from Cebu City. He is the son of Fernando Rama, a former Cebu City councilor, and brother of Eduardo L. Rama, the former congressman and governor of Agusan del Norte. His nephew is Cebu City Congressman Edu Rama Jr., son of his late brother governor Eduardo Rama Sr. He has a daughter named Micheline F. Rama and son named Mikel F. Rama.

Other relatives include: His grandfather is Don Vicente Rama, senator, Cebu City 1st inaugural mayor, 1st national assemblyman, congressman, councilor and "The Father of Cebu City". 

He is the nephew of Osmundo G. Rama, Governor of Cebu Province and of Commissioner Napoleon G. Rama, 1986 Constitutional Commission floor leader, Philippine Legion of Honor (Grand Commander) 26 February 2011 awardee. 

Capt. George Rama is his first cousin, the Barangay Captain of Basak San Nicolas of Cebu City and in addition his first cousin is talent manager, celebrity businesswoman Annabelle Rama, the mother of Ruffa, Richard, and Raymond Gutierrez.

References

External links
 www.mikerama.com

|-

|-

|-

1954 births
Living people
Visayan people
Mayors of Cebu City
Cebuano people
20th-century Filipino lawyers
Filipino city and municipal councilors
Bando Osmeña – Pundok Kauswagan politicians
Liberal Party (Philippines) politicians
PDP–Laban politicians
United Nationalist Alliance politicians
San Beda University alumni
Vice Mayors of Cebu City
Cebu City Council members